Petar Kacarević (1905–06), nicknamed Pera (Пера) and Čiča (чича, "uncle"), was a vojvoda (commander) of the Serbian Chetnik Organization active in the Maleševo region.

Kacarević hailed from Maleš on the Krivi Bor near Berovo. The Kacarević family adhered to the Patriarchate of Constantinople. Veljko Kacarević, an Orthodox priest from Berovo, was a Serbian teacher in the region in the 19th century, and manager of the Serbian schools in the region (fl. 1902). Ilija Kacarević, an alumnus of the Prizren Seminary, was a priest and the deputy of Berovo.

His band fought Bulgarians at Maleš on the 10th, 16th, 20 and 21 November 1905, without casualties. His band of 12 fighters fought with 186 Ottoman soldiers on the hill of Krivo Brdo near Berovo on 12 May 1906, with 10 casualties; the band had been betrayed by Bulgarian Exarchists in Berovo. He died while fighting on the Maleš.

References

Sources

 
 

19th-century births
20th-century deaths
20th-century Serbian people
Chetniks of the Macedonian Struggle
Serbs from the Ottoman Empire
People from Berovo Municipality